The Purple Dress is a 1918 two reel silent short film, directed by Martin Justice.

Cast
Agnes Ayres		
Adele DeGarde		
Edward Earle		
Evart Overton		
Bernard Siegel

External links

1918 films
American black-and-white films
American silent short films
Adaptations of works by O. Henry
Films directed by Martin Justice
1910s American films